The Hoffman family of New York is a prominent family whose ancestor Martin Hoffman was born in Reval (now Tallinn), then the capital of Swedish Estonia. He emigrated to the Dutch colony of New Netherland in 1657. Among his descendants were Governor of New York John T. Hoffman, Congressman Ogden Hoffman, New York Attorney General Josiah Ogden Hoffman, State Senator Anthony Hoffman, several clergymen of the Dutch Reformed Church, and President Franklin D. Roosevelt.

Family tree

References

 Genealogy of the Hoffman Family by Eugene Augustus Hoffman (Dodd, Mead and Company, New York)

 
Family trees
American families